Ekeby is a locality situated in Kumla Municipality, Örebro County, Sweden with 372 inhabitants in 2010.

Riksdag elections

References 

Populated places in Örebro County
Populated places in Kumla Municipality